Paul Haakonsson  was joint Earl of Orkney from 1122 until 1137.

Haakonsson served jointly as Earl of Orkney together with Harald Haakonsson. Paul Haakonsson had not been well loved by his female kin. In 1137, Paul was reportedly abdicated and  killed on the orders of the mother of Harald Haakonsson.  His mother and her sister, Frakkok, had previously tried to murder him with a poisoned shirt which instead caused the death of Harald Haakonsson in 1127.  It is said that Frakkok and her supporters had originally intended to advance the claims of Harald Haakonsson's son Erlend Haraldsson upon Paul's death. However,
Paul Haakonsson was replaced as Earl of Orkney by his second cousin, Rognvald Kali Kolsson,  one of the lead men of King Harald Gille of Norway. Rognvald Kali Kolsson did serve as guardian of  Harald Maddadsson, the nephew of Paul Haakonsson. In 1138, Rognvald appointed Harald Maddadsson as Earl of Orkney jointly with himself.

References

Paul Haakonsson
12th-century deaths
Year of death missing
Year of birth missing
Mormaers of Caithness